is a Japanese footballer playing as a centre-back. He currently play for Briobecca Urayasu.

Career
Akamatsu begin first youth career with Hokkaido Otani Muroran HS in 2009 until 2011. He later entered to college in Kanazawa from 2012.

After graduation in Kanazawa Seiryo University in 2015, Akamatsu begin first professional career with ReinMeer Aomori for 2016 season. He left for the club in 2018 after three years at Aomori expiration contract.

On 26 December 2020, Akamatsu joined to J3 club, Vanraure Hachinohe for 2021 season. He left for the club in 2022 after ended of contract in Hachinohe for two years.

On 26 January 2023, Akamatsu announcement officially transfer to JFL promoted club, Briobecca Urayasu for ahead of 2023 season.

Career statistics

Club
.

Notes

References

External links

1993 births
Living people
Association football people from Hokkaido
Kanazawa Seiryo University alumni
Japanese footballers
Japanese expatriate footballers
Association football defenders
Japan Football League players
Lao Premier League players
J3 League players
ReinMeer Aomori players
Vanraure Hachinohe players
Briobecca Urayasu players
Japanese expatriate sportspeople in Thailand
Expatriate footballers in Thailand
Japanese expatriate sportspeople in Laos
Expatriate footballers in Laos